Prosenella is a genus of beetles in the family Cerambycidae, containing the following species:

 Prosenella muehni (Bruch, 1933)
 Prosenella unicolor Martins & Galileo, 2003

References

Apomecynini